The Indiana Blizzard was a professional ice hockey team based in Dyer, Indiana. The team was a member of the All American Hockey League and began its inaugural season in October 2009 as the Detroit Hitmen. The Blizzard played their home games at the Midwest Training & Ice Center Arena.

History

The West Michigan Blizzard started their inaugural season in October 2009 as the Detroit Hitmen, located in Fraser, Michigan. Due to the financial issues, the team was relocated to Norton Shores, Michigan on December 17, 2009.  Matt Wiedenhoeft was the founding partner of the Hitmen, who orchestrated the relocation to the Muskegon, Michigan's L.C. Walker Arena. Their name was changed to the West Michigan Blizzard.

In September 2010, the team announced their relocation to Dyer, Indiana due to the inability for a new ice arena to get built in Norton Shores. After the relocation, the team changed their name to the Indiana Blizzard. Their new arena was at the Midwest Ice Center. Despite their new home, the team ceased operations in 2011.

Season-by-season record

Glossary: GP= Games played, W= Wins, L= Losses, OTL= Over Time Losses, SL= Shootout Losses, PTS= Points, PCT= Winning Percentage, GF= Goals For, GA= Goals Against, PIM= Penalty Minutes

Roster

References

External links
 Indiana Blizzard Website
 AAHL Website

Lake County, Indiana
Ice hockey clubs established in 2009
2009 establishments in Michigan
Ice hockey teams in Indiana